Ljubinka Jovanović, Beograd, 1922 – 3 August 2015) was a Serbian painter who lived and worked in Paris and Belgrade. She was strongly influenced by the iconic traditions of the Serbian medieval art, and inspired by the Serbo-Byzantine style of painting, developed in a modern style with specific signs on her chromatic paintings.

Biography
Ljubinka Jovanović was studying painting at the Academy of Fine Arts in Belgrade in class of prof. Ivan Tabaković. With her future husband, Milorad Bata Mihailović and his friends from the class Mića Popović, Petar Omčikus, Kossa Bokchan and Vera Božičković Popović in the 1947 year she went to Adriatic Coast where they formed an art commune “Zadar group”. She was a member of the group 'Eleven'. She has been exhibiting since 1951. Ljubinka Jovanović had numerous solo and group exhibitions in Serbia and abroad. With Bata Mihailović settled in Paris 1952. She died in Paris, France, on 3 August 2015.

Art
Like all members of the postwar generation of Serbian painter and Ljubinka Jovanović has gone through several phases, which, however, compared to other yet to be less dramatic in the stylistic changes. Basically, it is still relied on the power of color in the picture and less paid attention to form. Form in her paintings, after neo abstract period, but at the end of the 1960s took on the meaning of the character that has a close and direct sourcing in the form of asceticism a medieval Serbian fresco and icon painting. Upon such visual image it has built one of the author's most recognizable works in Serbian contemporary art of the late 20th century.

Solo exhibition (selection)
 1952 Galerija ULUS, Belgrade
 1953 Galerie Marseille, Paris
 1964 Galerie Ariel, Paris
 1965 Galerie Peintres du Monde, Paris, Long Island University, New York City
 1967 Salon Muzeja savremene umetnosti, Belgrade
 1976 Galerie de la ville, Rouen
 1977 Galerie Aritza, Bilbao
 1977 Galerie Toroves, Santiago, Galerie Rive gauche, Paris
 1980 Arcus, Paris
 1981 Moderna galerija, Budva
 1990 Umetnički paviljon „Cvijeta Zuzorić“, Belgrade (retrospective)
 1992 Savremena galerija Centra za kulturu, Pančevo
 1995 Galerija “Nadežda Petrović”, Čačak
 1996 Galerija „Nikola I“, Centar za kulturu, Nikšić
 1998 Galerija Haos, Belgrade
 2000 Galerija Rajka Mamuzića, Novi Sad
 2002 Galerija Centra za kulturu, Despotovac
 2003 Moderna galerija, Budva
 2006 Galerija RTS, Belgrade
 2010 Serbian Cultural Center, Paris (retrospective)

Bibliography (selection)
 1962 Georges Boudaille, Le Salon de Mai: Le goût de notre temps, Lettres françaises, du 10 au 16 mai, Paris
 1964 Jean-Jacaues Lévêque, Les merveillex univers de Lybinka, Galerie Ariel, Lettres françaises, février, Paris
 1964 Raoul-Jean Moulin, Lybinka, Cimaise, No 67, p. 78, Paris
 1964 Jean-Jacaues Lévêque, Lybinka - Galerie Ariel, Arts, mars, Paris
 1964 Jean-Jacaues Lévêque, Lybinka - Galerie Ariel, La Galerie des arts, 15 avril, p. 33, Paris
 1965 Georges Boudaille, (pref), Galerie Peintres du Monde, Paris
 1965 Raoul-Jean Moulin, (pref), Catalogue de l'exposition personelle à la Galerie Peintres du Monde, novembre, Paris
 1965 Georges Boudaille, Fascination du réel, Les Arts, 11 novembre, Paris
 1965 Jean-Jacaues Lévêque, L'artiste est-il un piège à images? Arts, du 10 au 16 novembre, Paris
 1965 Jean-Jacaues Lévêque, Icônes modernes, Arts, 11 novembre, Paris
 1965. Raoul-Jean Moulin, (pref), Trois peintres de Paris: Lybinka, Bitran, Mihailovitch, Umeo, (La Suède)
 1965 Jeanne Rollin, Nature et paysages, Humanité, 26 novembre, Paris
 1966 Jannine Lipsi, Lybinka, Beaux-Arts, 20 janvier, Paris

Sources

 Documentation of the Museum of Contemporary Art, Belgrade
 Ljubinka Jovanović, monograph, Karić Foundation, Belgrade, 2002
 http://www.ccserbie.com/lybinka.pdf

External links
  Gallery RTS - Ljubinka Jovanović-Mihailović
 Umrla LJubinka Jovanović Mihailović

Serbian painters
1922 births
Artists from Belgrade
Artists from Paris
Serbian women painters
2015 deaths
Yugoslav expatriates in France
Yugoslav painters